Frank Edward "Kid" Butler (1861–1921) was a Major League Baseball outfielder. He played for the 1884 Boston Reds in the Union Association.

Sources 

Major League Baseball outfielders
Boston Reds (UA) players
Baseball players from Massachusetts
19th-century baseball players
1861 births
Date of birth missing
1921 deaths
Bay City (minor league baseball) players
Newburyport Clamdiggers players
Biddeford (minor league baseball) players
Boston Blues players
Haverhill (minor league baseball) players